WAY-163,909 is a drug which acts as a potent and reasonably selective agonist for the serotonin 5-HT2C receptor. It has antipsychotic-like effects in animal models, and has been used to study the role of the 5-HT2C receptor subtype in the action of addictive drugs such as nicotine and methamphetamine.

See also 
 IHCH-7113
 Lorcaserin
 Ro60-0213
 Vabicaserin
 VER-3323
 YM-348

References 

5-HT2C agonists
Serotonin receptor agonists
Heterocyclic compounds with 4 rings
Benzodiazepines